Wilder Alfredo Wilson Pérez (born July 1, 2000) is a Nicaraguan footballer who plays as a defender for Nicaraguan side Diriangén and the Nicaragua national team.

International career
Wilson captained the Nicaragua U17s at the 2017 CONCACAF U-17 Championship qualifiers in November 2016 in Costa Rica, and later played at the 2018 UNCAF U-19 Tournament in Honduras. He was also called up to the Nicaragua Olympic team for the 2020 CONCACAF Men's Olympic Qualifying Championship qualification.

He made his debut for the Nicaragua senior national team on October 14, 2019, coming on for Kevin Serapio during a 4–0 win over Dominica in the 2019–20 CONCACAF Nations League.

International statistics

References

External links
 
 
 

Living people
2000 births
Nicaraguan men's footballers
Nicaragua international footballers
Association football defenders
Diriangén FC players
Nicaraguan Primera División players
People from Madriz Department